Wayne Barrett (July 11, 1945 – January 19, 2017) was an American journalist. He worked as an investigative reporter and senior editor for The Village Voice for 37 years, until he was laid off in 2011.

Early life and education 
Barrett was born on July 11, 1945, in New Britain, Connecticut, and was raised in Lynchburg, Virginia. He earned a Bachelor of Arts degree in journalism from Saint Joseph's University and a Master of Science in the discipline from the Columbia University Graduate School of Journalism, where he subsequently taught as an adjunct professor for over thirty years.

Career 
Following his tenure at The Village Voice, Barrett was a fellow at The Nation Institute and a contributor to Newsweek.

Barrett was best known for authoring many articles and books about politicians, including New York City figures such as Donald Trump, Rudy Giuliani and Ed Koch. Barrett was the first journalist to uncover Trump's business deceptions. He began reporting on Trump in the late 1970s and did 10 hours of taped interviews with Trump while the Grand Hyatt New York was under construction; his two-part series led to the impaneling of a federal grand jury in the Eastern District in Brooklyn against Trump. Barrett's 1991 biography of Trump was republished with the title of Trump: The Greatest Show on Earth: The Deals, the Downfall, the Reinvention in 2016.

Barrett's book, Rudy!: An Investigative Biography of Rudolph Giuliani, was adapted into a 2003 television film, Rudy: The Rudy Giuliani Story. He was interviewed for the 2006 documentary Giuliani Time and the 2017 documentary Get Me Roger Stone.

Barrett was a mentor to progressive activist and political commentator Nomiki Konst.

After Barrett's death, his complete writings were acquired by the Dolph Briscoe Center for American History at the University of Texas at Austin.

Death
Barrett died in Manhattan on January 19, 2017, from complications of interstitial lung disease and lung cancer. Coincidently, Barrett died the day before Trump was inaugurated as president. Barrett's writings on Trump continued to be relevant during the Trump presidency and were a valuable resource for journalists during that time.

Selected bibliography
The Big Apple: City for Sale: Ed Koch and the Betrayal of New York (Harper and Row, 1988) (with Jack Newfield) 
Trump: The Deals and the Downfall (HarperCollins, 1992)
Rudy!: An Investigative Biography of Rudolph Giuliani (Basic Books, 2001)
Grand Illusion: The Untold Story of Rudy Giuliani and 9/11 (HarperCollins, 2006, ; with Dan Collins)
Trump: The Greatest Show on Earth: The Deals, the Downfall, the Reinvention (Regan Arts [e-book] April 26, 2016, ASIN: B01ECUXPIM; Paperback Edition August 2016)

References

External links
The Real Rudy: From the September print issue: The image of Rudy Giuliani as the hero of September 11 has never been seriously challenged. That changes now, The American Prospect online September 11, 2006 
"Rudy Giuliani's 5 Big Lies About 9/11: On the Stump, Rudy Can't Help Spreading Smoke and Ashes About His Dubious Record", The Village Voice, August 8–14, 2007, pp. 22–36.
"Rudy's Ties to a Terror Sheikh: Giuliani's business contracts tie him to the man who let 9/11's mastermind escape the FBI", The Village Voice, November 27, 2007
Wayne Barrett Laid Off from Village Voice - video report by Democracy Now!

1945 births
2017 deaths
American male biographers
Writers from New Britain, Connecticut
Columbia University Graduate School of Journalism faculty
Saint Joseph's University alumni
Journalists from Connecticut
The Village Voice people
American investigative journalists
Newsweek people
American male journalists
20th-century American journalists
20th-century American biographers
21st-century American journalists
21st-century American biographers
Columbia University Graduate School of Journalism alumni
20th-century American male writers
Deaths from lung cancer in New York (state)
Deaths from lung disease